Patrick Reinhard Nielsen (born March 23, 1991) is a Danish former professional boxer. He is currently a member of the motorcycle club Satudarah MC. He challenged once for the WBA interim middleweight title in 2014. He has been in jail for violently beating the mother of his 2 children and causing life-threatening damages to the victim, which he denied.

He is the older brother of Micki Nielsen, who is also a professional boxer.

Professional boxing record

| style="text-align:center;" colspan="8"|30 Wins (14 knockouts), 3 Losses, 0 Draws
|-
|align=center style="border-style: none none solid solid; background: #e3e3e3"|Result
|align=center style="border-style: none none solid solid; background: #e3e3e3"|Record
|align=center style="border-style: none none solid solid; background: #e3e3e3"|Opponent
|align=center style="border-style: none none solid solid; background: #e3e3e3"|Type
|align=center style="border-style: none none solid solid; background: #e3e3e3"|Rd., Time
|align=center style="border-style: none none solid solid; background: #e3e3e3"|Date
|align=center style="border-style: none none solid solid; background: #e3e3e3"|Location
|align=center style="border-style: none none solid solid; background: #e3e3e3"|Notes
|-align=center
|Win
|30–3
|align=left| Armen Ypremyan
|
|
|
|align=left|
|align=left|
|-align=center
|Loss
|29–3
|align=left| Arthur Abraham
|
|
|
|align=left| 
|align=left|
|-align=center
|Loss
|29–2
|align=left| John Ryder
|
|
|
|align=left| 
|
|-align=center
|Win
|29–1
|align=left| Beibi Berrocal
|
|
|
|align=left|
|align=left|
|-align=center
|Win
|28–1
|align=left| Rudy Markussen
|
|
|
|align=left|
|align=left|
|-align=center
|Win
|27–1
|align=left| Samir Santos Barbosa
|
|
|
|align=left|
|align=left|
|-align=center
|Win
|26–1
|align=left| Charles Adamu
|
|
|
|align=left|
|align=left|
|-align=center
|Win||25–1
|align=left| Ruben Eduardo Acosta
|
|
|
|align=left|
|align=left|
|-align=center
|Win||24–1
|align=left| George Tahdooahnippah
|
|
|
|align=left|
|align=left|
|-align=center
|Win||23–1
|align=left| Lucasz Wawrzyczek
|UD
|
|
|align=left|
|align=left|
|-align=center
|Loss||22–1
|align=left| Dmitry Chudinov
|UD
|
|
|align=left|
|align=left| 
|-align=center
|Win||22–0
|align=left| Tony Jeter
|KO
|
|
|align=left|
|align=left| 
|-align=center
|Win||21–0
|align=left| José Pinzón
|TKO
|
|
|align=left|
|align=left| 
|-align=center
|Win||20–0
|align=left| Patrick Majewski
|UD
|
|
|align=left|
|align=left| 
|-align=center
|Win||19–0
|align=left| Crispulo Javier Andino
|KO
|
|
|align=left|
|align=left|
|-align=center
|Win||18–0
|align=left| Patrick Mendy
|UD
|
|
|align=left|
|align=left|
|-align=center
|Win||17–0
|align=left| Jamel Bakhi
|UD
|
|
|align=left|
|align=left|
|-align=center
|Win||16–0
|align=left| Jose Yebes
|UD
|
|
|align=left|
|align=left|
|-align=center
|Win||15–0
|align=left| Gaetano Nespro
|UD
|
|
|align=left|
|align=left|
|-align=center
|Win||14–0
|align=left| Gaston Alejandro Vega
|KO
|
|
|align=left|
|align=left|
|-align=center
|Win||13–0
|align=left| Jozsef Matolcsi
|KO
|
|
|align=left|
|align=left|
|-align=center
|Win||12–0
|align=left| Michael Schubov
|UD
|
|
|align=left|
|align=left|
|-align=center
|Win||11–0
|align=left| Farouk Daku
|UD
|
|
|align=left|
|align=left|
|-align=center
|Win||10–0
|align=left| Joe Rea
|TKO
|
|
|align=left|
|align=left|
|-align=center
|Win||9–0
|align=left| Gary Boulden
|UD
|
|
|align=left|
|align=left|
|-align=center
|Win||8–0
|align=left| Erik Avlastimov
|UD
|
|
|align=left|
|align=left|
|-align=center
|Win||7–0
|align=left| Adnan Salihu
|UD
|
|
|align=left|
|align=left|
|-align=center
|Win||6–0
|align=left| Laszlo Haaz
|TKO
|
|
|align=left|
|align=left|
|-align=center
|Win||5–0
|align=left| Janos Varga
|TKO
|
|
|align=left|
|align=left|
|-align=center
|Win||4–0
|align=left| Norbert Szekeres
|KO
|
|
|align=left|
|align=left|
|-align=center
|Win||3–0
|align=left| Alessandro Segurini
|UD
|
|
|align=left|
|align=left|
|-align=center
|Win||2–0
|align=left| Gabor Balogh
|TKO
|
|
|align=left|
|align=left|
|-align=center
|Win||1–0
|align=left| Zoltan Borovics
|TKO
|
|
|align=left|
|align=left|

References

Middleweight boxers
People from Albertslund Municipality
1991 births
Living people
Danish male boxers
Sportspeople from the Capital Region of Denmark